Kakarla may refer to:
Kakarla is a surname in which is predominant in higher caste( Yadav, kapu,balija,khamma, bhrahmin, and reddy) in the Indian states of Andhra Pradesh and Telangana.

People 
 Kakarla Subba Rao, bone radiologist and former director of Nizam's Institute of Medical Sciences, Hyderabad
 Kakarla Tyaga Brahmam or Tyagaraja (1767–1847), composer of Carnatic music

Geography 
 Kakarla, a village in Ardhaveedu mandal, in the Prakasam district of Andhra Pradesh, India
 Kakarlamudi, a village in Vemuru mandal, in the Guntur district of Andhra Pradesh, India
 Kakarla Thota, a village in Bellary District, City, Karnataka, India 
 Kakarlapalli, a village in Khammam district, Telangana, India
 Kakarlavaripalli , a village in Obulavaripalle Mandal of Cuddapah district in Andhra Pradesh State, India.  
 Kakala Vari Palli, A village in Chittoor District, Andra Pradesh, India
 Kakarla Vari Palli, A Village in Tirupati District, Andhra Pradesh, India

Indian surnames